Maria Anna de Raschenau (fl. 18th century) was an Austrian composer and canoness (a type of Augustinian nun). She was active in Vienna, but was not a member or servant of the noble court. She was the choirmaster at the convent of St Jakob auf der Hülben in Vienna. Raschenau wrote an oratorio on a libretto by MA Signorini, Le sacre visioni di Santa Teresa, which was first performed on 20 March 1703. The score was once in the Österreichische Nationalbibliothek, but was not in the catalogue by 1991, and is assumed to be lost. Her two oratorios and two secular works written for the state are now only known from libretti given out at performances. Raschenau was a contemporary of fellow female oratorio-writers Caterina Benedicta Grazianini, Maria Grimani, and Camilla de Rossi, who were also canonesses.

References

Pendle, Karin Women in Music: A History "Musical Women of the Seventeenth and Eighteenth Centuries" by Barbara Garvey Jackson, Indiana University Press, Bloomington IN, 2001.

Notes

18th-century Austrian people
Augustinian nuns
Austrian classical composers
Austrian women composers
Austrian Baroque composers
Women classical composers